Kleinmann is a common surname:

 Dieter Kleinmann (born 1953), German politician
 Georges Kleinmann, a French journalist
 Larissa Kleinmann (born 1978), German cyclist
 Louis Théodore Kleinmann (1907–1979)
 Ralf Kleinmann (born 1971, Cologne, Germany), a German-American football player
 Wilhelm Otto Max Kleinmann (1876–1945)
 Kleinmann's tortoise, Egyptian tortoise or Leith's tortoise (Testudo kleinmanni)

See also 
 Kleinman
 Kleiman

German-language surnames
Jewish surnames
Yiddish-language surnames